State Records is a British independent record label, established by Wayne Bickerton, Tony Waddington  and John Fruin in 1975. The label released hits by many successful artists including The Rubettes, Mac & Katie Kissoon and Delegation.

In July 2012, State released their back catalogue digitally for the first time; the release included over 100 of the label's singles and over 30 albums and compilations, to coincide with the release State announced their first new single in almost thirty years. "Every Road I Take" by The Life was released on 2 July 2012.

History
Bickerton and Waddington's relationship began in the 1950s: they began supporting ex-Beatles drummer Pete Best, making up the Pete Best Trio and touring around the world as a band, concluding with Bickerton and Waddington living in New York.

Upon returning to Britain, Bickerton became a producer with Decca Records and Waddington joined Decca Records' publishing company - Burlington Music. Shortly afterwards the two were signed to Burlington Music as a songwriting duo. Their first gold disc came with the release of Tom Jones' "Can't Stop Loving You".

In 1973, Bickerton and Waddington penned the song "Sugar Baby Love" and recorded it with some session musicians, releasing the record under the name The Rubettes, it quickly became a number one hit. Other Rubettes hits followed, plus chart success for Mac & Katie Kissoon.

The label continued to enjoy success throughout the 1970s and early 1980s until 1983, when the label released their last single, "You Don't Care About I" by Elite. In total State released over 100 singles and over 20 albums between 1975 and 1983.

State found success in the United States, most notably with the 1978 release "Oh Honey" by Delegation, which peaked at number 6 in the US Billboard R&B chart. The song has gone on to be sampled countless times including by artists such as Mariah Carey ("Boy (I Need You)"), Dizzee Rascal ("Chillin' Wiv Da Mandem") and Snoop Dogg ("Wonder What It Do").

Notable artists
The Rubettes
Mac & Katie Kissoon
Delegation
Gary Benson
Liverpool F.C. Squad 1977

UK Top 40 singles

References

External links
 Popmusic4synch.com

Record labels established in 1975
British independent record labels